Faisal Al-Ghamdi (born 13 August 2001) is a Saudi professional footballer who currently plays as a midfielder for Al-Ettifaq.

Career
Al-Ghamdi began his career at the youth team of Al-Ettifaq. He signed his first professional contract with the club on 12 December 2019. He made his first team debut for Al-Ettifaq on 5 May 2022 by coming off the bench in a 4–0 away win against Al-Taawoun. He made his first start for the club on 11 May 2022 in the 2–0 defeat to Al-Hilal.

International career

Saudi Arabia U20
Al-Ghamdi was part of the squad that qualified to the 2020 AFC U-19 Championship. He made 2 appearances during the qualifiers. Al-Ghamdi was also part of the squad that participated in the 2020 Arab Cup U-20.

Saudi Arabia U23
Al-Ghamdi earned his first call-up for the Saudi Arabia U23 national team during the 2021 Islamic Solidarity Games. He made 4 appearances throughout the competition as the Green Falcons finished in second place, earning a silver medal. Al-Ghamdi was also included in the squad that won the 2022 WAFF U-23 Championship.

Honours

International
Saudi Arabia U23
WAFF U-23 Championship: 2022

References

 

2001 births
Living people
People from Dammam
Saudi Arabian footballers
Saudi Arabia youth international footballers
Saudi Arabia international footballers
Ettifaq FC players
Saudi Professional League players
Association football midfielders